Fundamental may refer to:
 Chad

 Foundation of reality
 Fundamental frequency, as in music or phonetics, often referred to as simply a "fundamental"
 Fundamentalism, the belief in, and usually the strict adherence to, the simple or "fundamental" ideas based on faith in a system of thought
 Fundamentals: Ten Keys to Reality, a 2021 popular science book by Frank Wilczek
 The Fundamentals, a set of books important to Christian fundamentalism
 Any of a number of fundamental theorems identified in mathematics, such as:
 Fundamental theorem of algebra, a theorem regarding the factorization of polynomials
 Fundamental theorem of arithmetic, a theorem regarding prime factorization
 Fundamental analysis, the process of reviewing and analyzing a company's financial statements to make better economic decisions

Music 
 Fun-Da-Mental, a rap group
 Fundamental (Bonnie Raitt album), 1998
 Fundamental (Pet Shop Boys album), 2006
 Fundamental (Puya album) or the title song, 1999
 Fundamental (Mental As Anything album), 1985
 The Fundamentals (album), by Juvenile, 2014
 The Fundamentals, by Theo Croker, 2006
 Fundamentals, an EP by Raheem Jarbo, 2005

Other uses
 "Fundamentals" (Arrow), an episode of the television show Arrow

See also
 Fundamental Articles (disambiguation)
 Fundamental constant (disambiguation)
 Fundamental law (disambiguation)
 Fundamental matrix (disambiguation)
 Fundamental parallelogram (disambiguation)
 Fundamental physical constant (disambiguation)
 Fundamental plane (disambiguation)